The American Society of Magazine Editors (ASME) is an industry trade group for magazine journalists and editors of magazines published in the United States. ASME includes the editorial leaders of most major consumer magazine in print and digital extensions. The group advocates on behalf of member organizations with respect to First Amendment issues and serves as a networking hub for editors and other industry employees.

History
The ASME started as an outgrowth of the editorial committee of the Magazine Publishers of America in 1963. The initial goal of the organization was to defend the First Amendment, protect editorial independence and support the development of journalism.

ASME programs
ASME has sponsored the National Magazine Awards (also known as the Ellie Awards) since 1966, along with the Graduate School of Journalism at Columbia University. The Ellie Awards honor print and digital magazines that consistently demonstrate superior execution of editorial objectives, innovative techniques, noteworthy journalistic enterprise, and imaginative art direction. In 1966, Look received the first award. Money received the first award for digital journalism in 1997.

Magazine Editors’ Hall of Fame and Creative Excellence Awards honor editors, writers, and artists for career-long contributions to magazine journalism. Honorees are chosen by the ASME board of directors.

The ASME Best Cover Contest honors the most successful magazine covers of the year. The contest is two-fold: the ASME Best Cover Awards and the ASME Readers’ Choice Awards. Each cover entered in the Best Cover Contest is eligible to win both a Best Cover Award and a Readers’ Choice Award.

ASME hosts the annual American Magazine Media Conference, every year in February, a meeting for magazine media leaders. It is sponsored by the Association of Magazine Media in association with ASME. The conference addresses issues of concern to editors and publishers of print and digital publications.

Founded in 1967, the Magazine Internship Program places college juniors in internships at top consumer magazines for 10 weeks every summer. More than 250 alumni of this program now work in magazine media and include the editors in chief of major titles.

Membership
To be eligible for membership into ASME, you must be employed by a print or digital magazine edited and distributed in the United States, this includes: senior editors, art directors and photography editors. There are also four categories of membership: Chief Editor, Editor, Retired Editor and ASME NEXT. Chief Editors, Editors and Retired Editors are entitled to all the privileges of ASME membership. ASME NEXT members are not eligible to vote in ASME elections.

Administration
ASME is regulated by a 16-member board of directors, which serve 2-year terms. Directors may be selected for a second 2-year term upon election. Board elections are usually held during the first Wednesday in May at the ASME Annual Meeting. Currently, the chief executive of ASME is Sid Holt. The director is Nina Fortuna.

Board of directors 2015–2016
Mark Jannot, vice president, Content, National Audubon Society, president
James Bennet, editor in chief and co-president, The Atlantic, vice president
Amy DuBois Barnett
Dana Cowin, senior vice president, editor in chief, Food & Wine
Scott Dadich, editor in chief, Wired
Jonathan Dorn, senior vice president, Digital and Data, Active Interest Media
Jill Herzig, editor in chief, Dr. Oz THE GOOD LIFE
Christopher Keyes, vice president and editor, Outside
Janice Min, co-president and chief creative officer, Guggenheim Media's Entertainment Group
James Oseland, editor in chief, Rodale's Organic Life
Norman Pearlstine, executive vice president and chief content officer, Time Inc.
Dana Points, content director, Meredith Parents Network; editor in chief, Parents and American Baby
Michele Promaulayko, editor in chief, Yahoo! Health
Joshua Topolsky
David Zinczenko, president and chief executive officer, Galvanized Brands
Lucy Schulte Danziger, president and founder, 10 Point Ventures, Ex Officio

Founders

Executive officers
 Ted Patrick, chairman
 Robert E. Kenyon Jr., secretary

Executive committee members
 Betsy Talbot Blackwell (1905–1985), Mademoiselle
 Mary Buchanan, Parents
 Ralph Daigh, Fawcett Publications
 John H. Johnson (1918–2005), Johnson Publishing Company
 Robert M. Jones, Family Circle
 Daniel Mich (né Daniel Danforth Mich; 1905–1965), Look
 Wade Hampton Nichols (1915–1996), Good Housekeeping
 Philip Salisbury, Bill Brothers Publishing Corp. (see Talking Machine World)
 Robert Stein (1924–1914), Redbook

Former executives

Presidents

References

External links
 
 National Magazine Awards (archived 22 February 2009)

1963 establishments in the United States
American journalism organizations
Freedom of expression organizations
Organizations established in 1963
Organizations based in New York City